James Patrick Brandstatter (born ) is an American sports announcer.  He was the radio play-by-play announcer for the Michigan Wolverines football team.  He held the position of color commentator for the Detroit Lions for 31 years until the end of the 2017 season. Brandstatter is also a sports television show host and former radio show host; both TV and radio shows about Michigan football.  He played college football for the Wolverines, from 1969 to 1972, where he was a standout offensive tackle. Brandstatter has written two non-fiction books about UM experiences, both of which were best-sellers in the sports category. His other positions include the two-time president of the Detroit Sports Broadcasters Association. Brandstatter leaving the Detroit Lions radio broadcast was announced on July 10, 2018.

Early life

Childhood and family
Brandstatter was born in East Lansing, Michigan. He was one of 5 boys. His father Art Brandstatter, Sr. was named an All-American fullback for the Spartans football team in 1936. His father went on to become a Detroit Police officer. He was Head of the Michigan State University School of Criminal Justice.  Later he was named Head of the Federal Law Enforcement Training Center in Glynco, Georgia.
 Jim's older brother, Art Brandstatter, Jr., played defensive end for the Spartans from 1959 to 1961. Despite the family's legacy at MSU, Jim Brandstatter opted to attend the school's in-state rival the University of Michigan (the teams play annually for the Paul Bunyan Trophy). When asked about his early life and family in a November 2007 Detroit Free Press interview, Brandstatter responded:  "My brother Art played at Michigan State, and he was my hero. ... I went to all the games. I got to know all the players, the team. I was just a 10-year-old kid. That was great, but when I got into high school and was playing, Michigan recruited me and I fell in love with the place. ... So I went against the grain, went to Michigan and never regretted it."

Sports career
He was an offensive tackle on the Michigan Wolverines football team from 1969 to 1972 during  Coach Bo Schembechler's first three seasons. Brandstatter later noted one of his favorite memories as a player came in a 1971 victory against Michigan State.  Brandstatter recalled, "That was as good as it gets." He added: "Bo (Schembechler) used to say and (offensive line coach) Jerry Hanlon might say, I may have played my best game ever as a collegian in that game." Hanlon said about Brandstatter: "He got so fired up, he took over every defender that came his way." He added "It was one of the best games a tackle played for me. That particular game, he was an All-American."

Brandstatter made the All-Big Ten team in 1971 and played in two Rose Bowls, during his time with Michigan (1970 and 1972).

Brandstatter signed with the New England Patriots of the National Football League after going undrafted in the 1972 NFL Draft, but was released during training camp in June. He joined the Lansing All Stars of the Midwest Football League in August 1974, where his brother Art was the head coach. He also played with the team in 1975 when they became the Lansing Capitals.

Broadcasting career

Television

After graduating from the University of Michigan in 1972, Brandstatter was hired as the sports director of WEYI-TV in the Flint / Tri-Cities area. In 1975, Brandstatter was sports director at WILX-TV in the Lansing / Jackson area.  After two-and-a-half years, Brandstatter moved to Detroit and became a sports producer for WDIV.

In 1980, while working at WDIV, Brandstatter became the host of Michigan Replay, a weekly half-hour discussion, interview, and highlights program about Michigan Wolverines football. It originally featured his former head coach Bo Schembechler (until 1989). It later included former head coaches Gary Moeller (1990–1994), Lloyd Carr (1995–2007). In 2008 the TV Show became "Inside Michigan Football with Coach Rich Rodriguez (2008–2010), and Brady Hoke (2011–2014). Inside Michigan Football continues with head coach Jim Harbaugh.  After 30 years, Brandstatter remains the original host and the show has grown from being seen only in Southeastern Michigan to available nationwide on cable and satellite.

Radio

Brandstatter formerly hosted a weekly college football radio show, called Brandy and Bo with  Coach Bo Schembechler. Brandy and Bo talked with coaches previewing upcoming games and discussed issues facing collegiate football.

Brandstatter could be heard calling play-by-play of his alma mater's football games on the Michigan Sports Network, teaming with color analyst Dan Dierdorf, sideline reporter Doug Karsch. and studio analyst Jon Jansen until the end of the 2021 NCAA Division I FBS football season. From 1979 to 2013, Brandstatter was the color analyst on the Michigan radio broadcasts, while Frank Beckmann called play-by-play.

From 1987 until July 2018, Brandstatter analyzed National Football League games on the Detroit Lions Radio Network, teaming with play-by-play man Dan Miller and sideline reporter Tony Ortiz.

Brandstatter also hosts the syndicated weekly Inside Michigan Football TV Show highlighting players, game day highlights and comments by Coach Jim Harbaugh and other coaches and players, along with Doug Karsch and Ed Kengerski during the college football season.

Brandstatter gives comments and observations about football on football-related radio programs, heard on Detroit area radio stations as well as radio stations across the country.

Other
Besides football, Jim has broadcast golf on the Michigan Open Golf Championship radio and television network, and was an associate producer on the 'Ameritech Showdown', the Emmy Award winning telecast of the state's PGA Skins game tournament.

Awards and honors
Brandstatter has been inducted into the Michigan Sports Hall of Fame in 2013. In 2014, the Michigan Association of Broadcasters Hall of Fame and the Gridiron Greats Hall of Fame added his name to their honor rolls. And in 2016, he was inducted into the Lansing Area Sports Hall of Fame. He was voted in 2004 and 2008 as "Sportscaster of the Year in Michigan" by the National Sportscasters/Sportswriters Association.  He twice served as the president of the Detroit Sports Media Association.  In 2006, Brandstatter was named by the DSMA as the Ty Tyson Award winner for Excellence in Sports Broadcasting in Michigan.  Brandy and Bo twice won Michigan Association of Broadcasters ‘Best in Category’ honors. Michigan Replay/Inside Michigan Football has been nominated for Michigan Emmy Awards.

Freelance work
Jim Brandstatter, Inc., is his company. He is contacted and hired for public speaking engagements, event hosting, voice-overs and local commercials.

Author
Brandstatter has written two nonfiction books about Michigan Wolverines football: Tales from Michigan Stadium (published in 2002) and Tales from Michigan Stadium: Volume II (published in 2007). Both books became bestsellers in the sports category.

Personal life
Brandstatter's wife is Robbie Timmons, who also had a career in broadcasting. Timmons was the weekday news anchor at noon and 5 pm on  WXYZ-TV in Detroit from 1982 to 2010. In 1972 at WILX-TV, she became the first woman to anchor the evening news in America. She worked from 1972 to 1976 at WILX-TV in Lansing. Jim and Robbie met in 1975 while anchoring TV newscasts together at WILX-TV. In 1976, Timmons became the 11 pm co-anchor at WJBK-TV with Joe Glover. In 1982, Timmons moved to WXYZ-TV, where she anchored newscasts with Bill Bonds and most recently Carolyn Clifford. Timmons graduated from Ohio State University, whose football team is the Michigan football team's fierce arch-rival. Timmons announced her retirement in 2010, and her last broadcast was October 14 of that year.

Bibliography
Tales from Michigan Stadium by Jim Brandstatter 
Tales from Michigan Stadium, Volume II by Jim Brandstatter

References

Living people
American radio sports announcers
American television sports announcers
American television talk show hosts
College football announcers
Detroit Lions announcers
Michigan Wolverines football players
Michigan Wolverines football announcers
Midwest Football League (1962–1978) players
National Football League announcers
People from East Lansing, Michigan
Players of American football from Michigan
Sportswriters from Michigan
University of Michigan alumni
Year of birth missing (living people)